The following is a list of seaplanes, which includes floatplanes and flying boats. A seaplane is any airplane that has the capability of landing and taking off from water, while an amphibian is a seaplane which can also operate from land. (They do not include rotorcraft, or ground-effect vehicles which can only skim along close to the water)

A flying boat relies on its main hull for buoyancy, while a floatplane has a conventional aircraft fuselage fitted with external floats. In some locales, the term "seaplane" is used as a synonym for floatplane.

List
A small number of seaplanes have retractable beaching gear, which is not capable of being used for landings and takeoffs, but these remain flying boats or floatplanes and are not amphibians.

Many floatplanes, especially those since 1945, can have either conventional floats for operating just from water, or amphibious floats, which have retractable undercarriage built into them. 

Some experimental flying boats have used skis or hydrofoils to supplement their buoyancy when in motion, however they still rely on the buoyancy of a hull when they are not moving fast enough to lift out of the water.

|-
|3I Sky Arrow||Italy||Floatplane||Private||1992||Production|| ||
|-
|A41 Factory VNS-41||Vietnam||Amphibian||Trainer||2005||||||
|-
|AAC SeaStar||Canada||Amphibian||Private||1998||Homebuilt||91||
|-
|AAC Seastar Sealoon||Canada||Amphibian||Private||||Homebuilt||1||
|-
|AD Flying Boat||UK||Flying boat||Patrol||1915||Production||27||
|-
|AD Navyplane||UK||Floatplane||Patrol||1916||Prototype||1||
|-
|AD Seaplane Type 1000||UK||Floatplane||Attack||1915||Prototype||2||
|-
|AEA Loon||US||Floatplane||Experimental||1908||Experimental||1||
|-
|AEG Flugboot||Germany||Flying boat||Transport||1913|| || ||
|-
|Aero 2H||Yugoslavia||Floatplane||Trainer||1946||production||248||
|-
|Aero A.29||Czechoslovakia||Floatplane||Target tug||1927||Production||9||
|-
|Aero Gare Sea Hawk & Sea Hawker||US||Amphibian||Private||1982||Homebuilt|| ||
|-
|Aeromarine 39||US||Floatplane||Trainer||1917||Production||150||
|-
|Aeromarine 40||US||Flying boat||Trainer||1918||Production||50||
|-
|Aeromarine 50||US||Flying boat||Transport||1919||Production||unk.||
|-
|Aeromarine 75||US||Flying boat||Transport||1920||||8||Converted Felixstowe F5L/Curtiss F5L
|-
|Aeromarine 80 Aerial Cruiser||US||Flying boat||Transport||1920||Prototype||unk.||
|-
|Aeromarine 700||US||Floatplane||Bomber||1917||Prototype||2||
|-
|Aeromarine AMC||US||Flying boat||Transport||1923||Prototype||1||
|-
|Aeromarine AS||US||Floatplane||Fighter||1920||Prototype||3||
|-
|Aeromarine EO||US||Flying boat||Transport||1924||Prototype||1||
|-
|Aeronca Chief family||US||Floatplane||Transport||1937||production||13700||
|-
|Aeroprakt A-24 Viking||Ukraine||Amphibian||Private||||||||
|-
|AGO C.I-W||Germany||Floatplane||Patrol||1915||production||64||
|-
|Aichi AB-6||Japan||Floatplane||Patrol||1933||Prototype||1||
|-
|Aichi E8A||Japan||Floatplane||Patrol||||Prototype||2||
|-
|Aichi E11A||Japan||Flying boat||Patrol||1937||Production||17||
|-
|Aichi E13A||Japan||Floatplane||Patrol||1938||Production||1418||
|-
|Aichi E16A Zuiun||Japan||Floatplane||Patrol||1942||Production||256||
|-
|Aichi H9A||Japan||Flying boat||Trainer||1940||Production||31||
|-
|Aichi M6A Seiran||Japan||Floatplane||Attack||1943||Production||26||
|-
|AirMax SeaMax||Brazil||Flying boat||||2001||||||
|-
|Airspeed Queen Wasp||UK||Floatplane||Target drone||1937|||| ||
|-
|Airtime Aircraft Cygnet||US||Amphibian||Private||2009|||||||Powered hang glider
|-
|Albatros L102W||Germany||Floatplane||Trainer||1932|||| ||
|-
|Albatros W.1||Germany||Floatplane||Trainer||1914||||||
|-
|Albatros W.2||Germany||Floatplane||Patrol||1916||||1||
|-
|Albatros W.3||Germany||Floatplane||Bomber||1916||||1||
|-
|Albatros W.4||Germany||Floatplane||Fighter||1916||||||
|-
|Albatros W.8||Germany||Floatplane||||1918||||||
|-
|American Champion/Bellanca Citabria||US||Floatplane||Private||1964||||||
|-
|Anderson Kingfisher||US||Amphibian||Private||1969||Homebuilt||||
|-
|Ansaldo SVA Idro||Italy||Floatplane||Fighter||1917||Production||50||
|-
|Aquaflight Aqua I||US||Amphibian||Transport||1946||||||
|-
|Arado Ar 66b||Germany||Floatplane||Trainer||1932||Prototype||1||
|-
|Arado Ar 95W||Germany||Floatplane||Patrol||1937||Production||42||
|-
|Arado Ar 196||Germany||Floatplane||Patrol||1937||Production||541||
|-
|Arado Ar 199||Germany||Floatplane||Trainer||1939||Production||31||
|-
|Arado Ar 231||Germany||Floatplane||Patrol||1941||||6||
|-
|Arado SSD I||Germany||Floatplane||Fighter||1930||||||
|-
|Arado W II||Germany||Floatplane||Trainer||1928||||||
|-
|Argonaut Pirate||US||Amphibian||Private||1935|| ||2||
|-
|Armstrong Whitworth Atlas||UK||Floatplane||Patrol||1925||||||
|-
|ATOL 495||Finland||Amphibian||Private||1989||||||
|-
|ATOL 650||Finland||Amphibian||Private||2011||||||
|-
|Aviat Husky||US||Floatplane||Transport||1986||||||
|-
|AVIC TA-600/AG600||China||Amphibian||||2017||||||
|-
|Avro Type D||UK||Floatplane||||1911||||1 ||Rebuilt as Royal Aircraft Factory H.R.E.3
|-
|Avro H, 501 & 503||UK||Floatplane||Patrol||1913||||5||Built as Gotha WD.1
|-
|Avro 552 Viper/Wright||UK||Floatplane||Trainer/Patrol||1921||||||
|-
|Avro 534A Water Baby||UK||Floatplane||Racer||1919||||||
|-
|Avro type 554 Antarctic Baby||UK||Floatplane||Transport||1919||||||
|-
|Avro 605 Avian||UK||Floatplane||Transport||1926||||||
|-
|Avro 643 Cadet||UK||Floatplane||Trainer||1931||||||
|-
|Barkley-Grow T8P-1||US||Floatplane||Transport||1937||Production||11||
|-
|Bastianelli P.R.B.||Italy||Flying boat||Transport||1921||Prototype||1||
|-
|Beardmore Inverness/Rohrbach Ro IV||UK||Flying boat||Patrol||1925||Prototype||2||
|-
|Beechcraft Model 17 Staggerwing||US||Floatplane||Transport||1932||Production||785||
|-
|Beechcraft Model 18||US||Floatplane||Transport||1937||Production||||
|-
|Bellanca 31-40 & 31-42 Senior Pacemaker||US||Floatplane||Transport||1935||||33||
|-
|Bellanca 77-320||US||Floatplane||Bomber/transport||1934||Production|| ||
|-
|Bellanca Aircruiser||US||Floatplane||Transport||1930||Production||23||
|-
|Bellanca CH-300 Pacemaker||US||Floatplane||Transport||1929||Production||35||
|-
|Bellanca CH-400 Skyrocket||US||Floatplane||Transport||1930||Production||32||
|-
|Bellanger-Denhaut 22 (HB.3)||France||Flying boat||Patrol||1920s||||||
|-
|Benoist XIV Air-Boat||US||Flying boat||Transport||1913||||2||
|-
|Beriev Be-6||USSR||Flying boat||Patrol||1949||Production||123||
|-
|Beriev Be-8||USSR||Amphibian||Transport||1947||Prototype||2||One had hydrofoils
|-
|Beriev Be-10||USSR||Flying boat||Patrol||1956||Production||28||
|-
|Beriev Be-12 Chaika||USSR||Amphibian||Patrol||1960||Production||150||
|-
|Beriev Be-40/A-40 Albatross||USSR||Amphibian||Patrol||1986||Prototype||1||
|-
|Beriev Be-103||Russia||Amphibian||Transport||1997||Production||||
|-
|Beriev Be-200||Russia||Amphibian||Transport||1998||Production||17||Also a Waterbomber
|-
|Beriev KOR-1 (Be-2)||USSR||Floatplane||Patrol||1936||Production||12||
|-
|Beriev KOR-2 (Be-4)||USSR||Flying boat||Patrol||1940||Production||47||
|-
|Beriev MBR-2||USSR||Flying boat||Patrol||1931||Production||1365||
|-
|Beriev MBR-7||USSR||Flying boat||Patrol||1937||Prototype||||
|-
|Beriev MDR-5||USSR||Flying boat||Patrol||1937||Prototype||2||
|-
|Beriev R-1||USSR||Flying boat||Patrol||1952||Prototype||1||
|-
|Bernard H.52||France||Floatplane||Fighter||1933||||||
|-
|Bernard H.110||France||Floatplane||Fighter||1935||||||
|-
|Bernard H.V.40||France||Floatplane||Racer||1931||||||
|-
|Bernard H.V.41||France||Floatplane||Racer||1929||||1||
|-
|Bernard H.V.42||France||Floatplane||Racer||1931||||3||
|-
|Bernard H.V.120||France||Floatplane||Racer||1930||||||
|-
|Bernard H.V.220||France||Floatplane||Racer||||Prototype||1||Not flown
|-
|Besson H-3||France||Flying boat||Transport||1920||||1||
|-
|Besson H-5||France||Flying boat||Transport||1922||||1||
|-
|Besson H-6||France||Flying boat||Transport||1921||||1||
|-
|Besson LB||France||Flying boat||Patrol||1917||||||
|-
|Besson MB.26||France||Floatplane||Patrol||1925||||||
|-
|Besson MB.35||France||Floatplane||Patrol||1926||||||
|-
|Besson MB.36||France||Flying boat||Transport||1930||||||
|-
|Besson MB.410 & 411||France||Floatplane||Patrol||1932||||||
|-
|Blackburn B-20||UK||Flying boat||Patrol||1940||||||
|-
|Blackburn Dart||UK||Floatplane||Bomber||1921||||||
|-
|Blackburn Iris||UK||Flying boat||Patrol||1926||||||
|-
|Blackburn Nautilus||UK||Floatplane||Fighter/patrol||1929||||||
|-
|Blackburn Pellet||UK||Flying boat||Racer||1923|| ||1||
|-
|Blackburn Perth||UK||Flying boat||Patrol||1934||||||
|-
|Blackburn Ripon||UK||Floatplane||Bomber||1926||||||
|-
|Blackburn Roc||UK||Floatplane||Bomber||1938||||||
|-
|Blackburn Shark||UK||Floatplane||Bomber||1933||||||
|-
|Blackburn Sprat||UK||Floatplane||Trainer||1926||||||
|-
|Blackburn Sydney||UK||Flying boat||Patrol||1931||||||
|-
|Blackburn Twin Blackburn||UK||Floatplane||Fighter||1915||||||Zeppelin interceptor
|-
|Blackburn Type L||UK||Floatplane||||1915|||| ||
|-
|Blackburn Velos||UK||Floatplane||Patrol||1925||||||
|-
|Blanchard BB-1||France||Flying boat||Racer||1924||||||
|-
|Blanchard Brd.1||France||Flying boat||Patrol||1922||||||
|-
|Blériot 290||France||Amphibian||Private||1931||||||
|-
|Blériot 5190||France||Flying boat||Transport||1933||||||
|-
|Blériot-SPAD S.XIV||France||Floatplane||Fighter||1917||||||
|-
|Blohm & Voss BV 138||Germany||Flying boat||Patrol||1937||||||
|-
|Blohm & Voss BV 222||Germany||Flying boat||Transport/Patrol||1940||||||
|-
|Blohm & Voss BV 238||Germany||Flying boat||Patrol||1944||Prototype||1||
|-
|Blohm & Voss Ha 139||Germany||Floatplane||Transport||1936||||||
|-
|Blohm & Voss Ha 140||Germany||Floatplane||Patrol||1937||||||
|-
|Boeing 314 Clipper||US||Flying boat||Transport||1939||||||
|-
|Boeing L-15 Scout||US||Floatplane||Patrol||1946||||||
|-
|Boeing Model 1||US||Floatplane||Transport||1916||||||
|-
|Boeing Model 2||US||Floatplane||Transport||1917||||||
|-
|Boeing Model 3||US||Floatplane||Transport||1917||||||
|-
|Boeing Model 5||US||Floatplane||Transport||1918||||||
|-
|Boeing Model 6||US||Flying boat||Transport||1919||||||
|-
|Boeing Model 6D||US||Flying boat||Transport||1928||||||
|-
|Boeing Model 7||US||Flying boat||Transport||1920||||||
|-
|Boeing Model 204||US||Flying boat||Transport||1929|| ||7|| 
|-
|Boeing XPB||US||Flying boat||Patrol||1924||||||
|-
|Boeing XPBB Sea Ranger||US||Flying boat||Patrol||1942||||||
|-
|Boeing-Canada A-213 Totem||Canada||Flying boat||Transport||1930||||||
|-
|Bombardier CL-415||Canada||Amphibian||Waterbomber||1993||Production||95||
|-
|Borel hydro-monoplane||France||Floatplane||Racer||1912|| ||||
|-
|Borel Type Bo.11||France||Floatplane||Transport||1911||Production||||
|-
|Borel-Odier Type Bo-C/B.O.20||France||Floatplane||Transport||1919||Prototype||1||
|-
|Borel-Odier Type Bo-T/B.O.2||France||Floatplane||Bomber/Transport||1916||Production|||92||
|-
|Breda A.4 Idro||Italy||Floatplane||Trainer||1926||Production|| ||
|-
|Breda A.7 Idro ||Italy||Floatplane||Patrol||1929||Production||14||
|-
|Breda Ba.15H||Italy||Floatplane||Private||1928||Production|| ||
|-
|Breda Ba.25-I||Italy||Floatplane||Trainer||1931||Production||766||
|-
|Breguet 521 & 522 Bizerte||France||Flying boat||Patrol||1933||||||
|-
|Breguet 530 Saigon||France||Flying boat||Transport||1935||||||
|-
|Breguet 730 & 731||France||Flying boat||Patrol||1938||||||
|-
|Breguet 790 Nautilus||France||Flying boat||Patrol||1939||||||
|-
|Breguet S.8/2 Calcutta||France||Flying boat||Patrol||1932||||||
|-
|Breguet Type V||France||Floatplane||Racer||1912||||||
|-
|Bristol Bolingbroke Mk.III||Canada||Floatplane||Patrol||1939||||||
|-
|Bristol XLRQ||US||Amphibian||Transport||1943||Prototype||2||
|-
|Brun-Cottan Patrol Flying Boat||France||Flying boat||Patrol||1918||Prototype||1||
|-
|Brunner-Winkle Bird||US||Floatplane||Transport||1928||Production||240||
|-
|Budd BB-1 Pioneer||US||Flying boat||Experimental||1931||Prototype||1||
|-
|Buhl CA-6 Airsedan||US||Floatplane||Transport/Patrol||1935||Production||4||
|-
|Burgess-Dunne Hydro||US||Floatplane||Trainer||1914|| || ||
|-
|Burgess HT-2 Speed Scout||US||Floatplane||Patrol||1917||||8||
|-
|Burgess Model I||US||Floatplane||Patrol||1913||Prototype||1||
|-
|Burgess Model K||US||Flying boat||Patrol||1913||Prototype||1||
|-
|Burgess Model L & S||US||Floatplane||Trainer||1916||Prototype|| ||
|-
|Burgess Model U/U-2/NU-2||US||Floatplane||Trainer||1917||||13||
|-
|CAMS 30||France||Flying boat||Trainer||1922||Production||31||
|-
|CAMS 31||France||Flying boat||Fighter||1922||Prototype||2||
|-
|CAMS 33||France||Flying boat||Patrol/Transport||1923||Production||21||
|-
|CAMS 36||France||Flying boat||Racer||1922||Prototype||2||
|-
|CAMS 37||France||Amphibian||Patrol/Transport||1926||Production||332||
|-
|CAMS 38||France||Flying boat||Racer||1923|| ||1||
|-
|CAMS 46||France||Flying boat||Trainer||1926||Production||15||
|-
|CAMS 53||France||Flying boat||Transport||1928||Production||30 ca.||
|-
|CAMS 55||France||Flying boat||Patrol||1927||Production||112||
|-
|CAMS 58||France||Flying boat||Transport||1931||Prototype||4||
|-
|Canadair CL-215||Canada||Amphibian||Waterbomber||1967||Production||125||
|-
|Canadian Vickers Vancouver||Canada||Flying boat||Patrol||1929||Production||6||
|-
|Canadian Vickers Vanessa||Canada||Floatplane||Transport||1927||Prototype||1||
|-
|Canadian Vickers Varuna||Canada||Flying boat||Patrol||1927||Production||8||
|-
|Canadian Vickers Vedette||Canada||Flying boat||Patrol||1924||Production||60||
|-
|Canadian Vickers Velos||Canada||Floatplane||Patrol||1928||Prototype||1||
|-
|Canadian Vickers Vista||Canada||Flying boat||Trainer||1927||Prototype||1||
|-
|Cañete Pirata||Spain||Flying boat||Patrol||1927||||||
|-
|CANT 6||Italy||Flying boat||Patrol||1925||Prototype||3||
|-
|CANT 7||Italy||Flying boat||Trainer||1924||Production||34||
|-
|CANT 10||Italy||Flying boat||Transport||1925||Production||18||
|-
|CANT 18||Italy||Flying boat||Trainer||1926||Production||29||
|-
|CANT 21||Italy||Flying boat||Patrol||1927||Prototype||2||
|-
|CANT 22||Italy||Flying boat||Transport||1927||Production||10||
|-
|CANT 25||Italy||Flying boat||Fighter||1927||Production||37||
|-
|CANT Z.501 Gabbiano||Italy||Flying boat||Patrol||1934||Production||454||
|-
|CANT Z.504||Italy||Flying boat||Patrol||1934||Prototype||1||
|-
|CANT Z.505||Italy||Floatplane||Transport||1935||Prototype||1||
|-
|CANT Z.506||Italy||Floatplane||Transport/Patrol||1935||Production||356||
|-
|CANT Z.508||Italy||Flying boat||Bomber||1936||Prototype||3||
|-
|CANT Z.509||Italy||Floatplane||Transport||1937||Prototype||3||
|-
|CANT Z.511||Italy||Floatplane||Transport||1940||Prototype||2||
|-
|CANT Z.515||Italy||Floatplane||Patrol||1939||Production||11||
|-
|Caproni Ca.39||Italy||Floatplane||Bomber||late 1910s||Prototype||||
|-
|Caproni Ca.43||Italy||Floatplane||Bomber||1917||Prototype||||
|-
|Caproni Ca.47||Italy||Floatplane||Bomber||late 1910s||||||
|-
|Caproni Ca.60||Italy||Flying boat||Transport||1921||||||
|-
|Caproni Ca.310 Idro||Italy||Floatplane||Transport||1937||||||
|-
|Caproni Ca.316||Italy||Floatplane||Patrol||1940||Prototypes||14||
|-
|Caspar U.1||Germany||Floatplane||Patrol||1922||||||
|-
|Caudron G.3||France||Floatplane||Patrol||1913||Production||||
|-
|Caudron G.4||France||Floatplane||Patrol||1913||Production||8||
|-
|Cessna 150||US||Floatplane||Transport||1967||||||
|-
|Cessna 170||US||Floatplane||Transport||1948||||||
|-
|Cessna 172||US||Floatplane||Transport||1956||||||
|-
|Cessna 180 Skywagon||US||Floatplane||Transport||1952||||||
|-
|Cessna 182 Skylane||US||Floatplane||Transport||1956||||||
|-
|Cessna 185 Skywagon||US||Floatplane||Transport||1960||||||
|-
|Cessna 190||US||Floatplane||Transport||1945||||||
|-
|Cessna 206||US||Floatplane||Transport||1962||||||
|-
|Cessna 208 Caravan||US||Floatplane||Transport||1982||||||
|-
|Cessna AT-17 Bobcat||US||Floatplane||Transport||1939||||||
|-
|Chetverikov MDR-6 (Che-2)||USSR||Flying boat||Patrol||1939||||||
|-
|Chetverikov OSGA-101||USSR||Amphibian||Experimental||1934||||||
|-
|Chetverikov SPL||USSR||Flying boat||Patrol||1935||||||
|-
|Chetverikov TA-1||USSR||Amphibian||Transport||1947||||||
|-
|Claude Dornier Sea Star||Germany||Amphibian||||1986||||||
|-
|Colonial Skimmer C-1 and C-2||US||Flying boat||||1960s||||||
|-
|Consolidated Commodore||US||Flying boat||Transport||1929||Production||14||
|-
|Consolidated NY||US||Floatplane||Trainer||1926||Production||302||
|-
|Consolidated P2Y||US||Flying boat||Patrol||1929||Production||78||
|-
|Consolidated PB2Y Coronado||US||Flying boat||Patrol||1937||Production||217||
|-
|Consolidated PBY Catalina||US||Flying boat||Patrol||1935||Production||3308||some versions amphibious.
|-
|Consolidated XP4Y Corregidor||US||Flying boat||Patrol||1939||Prototype||1||
|-
|Consolidated XPY-1 Admiral||US||Flying boat||Transport||1929||Prototype||1||
|-
|Convair F2Y Sea Dart||US||Flying boat||Fighter||1953||Prototype||5||hydro-skis
|-
|Convair R3Y Tradewind||US||Flying boat||Transport||1950||Production||13||
|-
|Coutant RMC 17||France||Floatplane||Patrol||1917||Production|| ||
|-
|Curtiss CR-3 & 4||US||Floatplane||Racer||1923||||||
|-
|Curtiss CT-1||US||Floatplane||Bomber||1921||||||
|-
|Curtiss H-12||US||Flying boat||Patrol||1916||||||
|-
|Curtiss H-16||US||Flying boat||Patrol||1917||||||
|-
|Curtiss HS||US||Flying boat||Patrol||1917||||||
|-
|Curtiss Model 2||US||Floatplane||Patrol||1915||||||
|-
|Curtiss Model E||US||Floatplane||Racer||1911||||||
|-
|Curtiss Model F||US||Flying boat||||1912||||||
|-
|Curtiss Model K||US||Flying boat||||1915||||||
|-
|Curtiss N-9||US||Floatplane||Trainer||1916||||||
|-
|Curtiss NC||US||Flying boat||Experimental||1919||||||Trans-Atlantic
|-
|Curtiss SC Seahawk||US||Floatplane||Patrol||1944||||||
|-
|Curtiss SO3C Seamew||US||Floatplane||Patrol||1939||||||
|-
|Curtiss SOC Seagull||US||Floatplane||Patrol||1934||||||
|-
|Curtiss-Wright CA-1 Commuter||US||Amphibian||Transport||1935||||||
|-
|Curtiss-Wright CW-3 Duckling||US||Flying boat||Private||1931||||||
|-
|Dayton-Wright FP.2||US||Floatplane||Patrol||1921||Prototype||1||
|-
|de Havilland Canada DHC-2 Beaver||Canada||Floatplane||Transport||1947||Production||1657||
|-
|de Havilland Canada DHC-3 Otter||Canada||Floatplane||Transport||1951||Production||466||
|-
|de Havilland Canada DHC-6 Twin Otter||Canada||Floatplane||Transport||1965||Production||985||
|-
|de Havilland DH.50||UK||Floatplane||Transport||1923||||||
|-
|de Havilland DH.60 Moth||UK||Floatplane||Private||1925||||||
|-
|de Havilland DH.61 Giant Moth||UK||Floatplane||Transport||1927||||3||
|-
|de Havilland DH.83 Fox Moth||UK||Floatplane||Transport||1932||||||
|-
|de Havilland DH.89 Dragon Rapide||UK||Floatplane||Transport||1934||||||
|-
|de Havilland DH.90 Dragonfly||UK||Floatplane||Transport||1935||||||
|-
|de Havilland Hornet Moth||UK||Floatplane||Transport||1934||||||
|-
|Deperdussin Monocoque||France||Floatplane||Racer||1913||||||
|-
|Dewoitine HD.730||France||Floatplane||Patrol||1940||||||
|-
|Dewoitine HD.780||France||Floatplane||Fighter||1940||||||
|-
|DFS Seeadler||Germany||Flying boat||Sailplane||1936||||||
|-
|Donnet-Denhaut D.D.1||France||Flying boat||Patrol||1915||Prototype||1||
|-
|Donnet-Denhaut D.D.2||France||Flying boat||Patrol||1916||Production||401||
|-
|Donnet-Denhaut D.D.8||France||Flying boat||Patrol||1917||Production||500+||
|-
|Donnet-Denhaut D.D.9||France||Flying boat||Patrol||1918||Production||100||
|-
|Donnet-Denhaut D.D.10||France||Flying boat||Patrol||1918||Production||30||
|-
|Donnet-Denhaut P.10||France||Flying boat||Patrol||1918||Prototype||1||
|-
|Donnet-Denhaut P.15||France||Flying boat||Patrol/Transport||1919||Prototype||1||
|-
|Donnet-Lévêque Type A||France||Flying boat||||1912||||||Also built as the FBA-Lévêque
|-
|Donnet-Lévêque Type B||France||Flying boat||||1910s||||||
|-
|Donnet-Lévêque Type C||France||Flying boat||||1910s||||||
|-
|Dornier Do 12||Germany||Amphibian||Transport||1932||||||
|-
|Dornier Do 14||Germany||Flying boat||Experimental||1934||||||
|-
|Dornier Do 16 Wal||Germany||Flying boat||Patrol||1923||||||
|-
|Dornier Do 18||Germany||Flying boat||Patrol||1935||||||
|-
|Dornier Do 22||Germany||Floatplane||Transport||1938||||||
|-
|Dornier Do 24 & Do 318||Germany||Flying boat||Patrol||1937||||||
|-
|Dornier Do 26||Germany||Flying boat||Transport||1938||||||
|-
|Dornier Do 212||Germany||Flying boat||Experimental||1942||||||
|-
|Dornier Do A Libelle||Germany||Flying boat||Private||1921||||||
|-
|Dornier Do D||Germany||Floatplane||Bomber||1924||||||
|-
|Dornier Do E||Germany||Flying boat||Patrol||1924||||||
|-
|Dornier Do J Wal||Germany||Flying boat||Transport/Patrol||1922||||||
|-
|Dornier Do L Delphin||Germany||Flying boat||Transport||1920||||||
|-
|Dornier Do R Super Wal||Germany||Flying boat||Transport||1926||||||
|-
|Dornier Do S||Germany||Flying boat||Transport||1930||||||
|-
|Dornier Do X||Germany||Flying boat||Transport||1929||||||
|-
|Dornier S-Ray 007||Germany||Amphibian||Private||2007||||||
|-
|Dornier Seastar||Germany||Amphibian||Transport||1985||||||
|-
|Douglas DF||US||Flying boat||Transport||1936||||||
|-
|Douglas Dolphin||US||Amphibian||Transport||1931||||||
|-
|Douglas DT||US||Floatplane||Bomber||1921||||||
|-
|Douglas World Cruiser||US||Floatplane||Experimental||1923||||||First flight around world. 
|-
|Douglas PD||US||Flying boat||Patrol||1929||||||
|-
|Douglas Sinbad||US||Flying boat||Transport||1930||||||
|-
|Douglas T2D||US||Floatplane||Bomber||1927||||||
|-
|Douglas YOA-5||US||Amphibian||Patrol||1935||||||
|-
|EAF L.33 Chelóna||Greece||Floatplane||Multi-role||1938||||||
|-
|Eastman E-2 Sea Rover||US||Flying boat||Transport||1928||||||
|-
|Edo OSE-1||US||Floatplane||Patrol||1946||||||
|-
|EDRA Aeronautica Super Pétrel||Brazil||Amphibian||Private||2002||||||
|-
|Eklund TE-1||Finland||Amphibian||Private||1949||||||
|-
|Elias EM||US||Floatplane||||1922||||||
|-
|Elias EO||US||Floatplane||Patrol||1922||||||
|-
|Ellison-Mahon Gweduck||US||Amphibian||Private||2009||Homebuilt||||
|-
|English Electric Ayr||UK||Flying boat||Patrol||1924||||||
|-
|English Electric Kingston||UK||Flying boat||Patrol||1924||||||
|-
|FBA 10||France||Amphibian||Patrol||1922||||||
|-
|FBA 11||France||Flying boat||Trainer||1923||||||
|-
|FBA 12||France||Flying boat||Trainer||1920s||||||
|-
|FBA 13||France||Flying boat||Trainer||1920s||||||
|-
|FBA 16||France||Flying boat||Trainer||1920s||||||
|-
|FBA 17||France||Flying boat||Trainer||1920s||||||
|-
|FBA 19||France||Flying boat||Bomber||1924||||||
|-
|FBA 21||France||Amphibian||Transport||1925||||||
|-
|FBA 290||France||Flying boat||Transport||1930||||||
|-
|FBA 310||France||Flying boat||Transport||1930||||||
|-
|FBA Type A||France||Flying boat||Racer||1913||||||
|-
|FBA Type B||France||Flying boat||Patrol||1915||||||
|-
|FBA Type C||France||Flying boat||Patrol||1910s||||||
|-
|FBA Type H||France||Flying boat||Patrol||1920s||||||
|-
|FBA Type S||France||Flying boat||Patrol||1917||||||
|-
|Fabre Hydravion||France||Floatplane||Experimental||1910||||||
|-
|Fairchild 24||US||Floatplane||Transport||1932||||||
|-
|Fairchild 45-80 Sekani||Canada||Floatplane||Transport||1937||Prototype||2||
|-
|Fairchild 71||US||Floatplane||Transport||1926||||||
|-
|Fairchild 82||Canada||Floatplane||Transport||1935||||||
|-
|Fairchild 91||US||Amphibian||Transport||1935||||||
|-
|Fairchild F-11 Husky||Canada||Floatplane||Transport||1946||||||
|-
|Fairchild FB-3||US||Flying boat||Transport||1929||||||
|-
|Fairchild FC-2||US||Floatplane||Transport||1926||||||
|-
|Fairchild KR-34||US||Floatplane||Trainer||1928||||||
|-
|Fairchild Sekani||Canada||Floatplane||Transport||1937||||||
|-
|Fairchild Super 71||Canada||Floatplane||Transport||1934||||||
|-
|Fairey Campania||UK||Floatplane||Patrol||1917||Production||62||
|-
|Fairey Flycatcher||UK||Floatplane||Fighter||1922||Production||196||
|-
|Fairey Fremantle||UK||Floatplane||Patrol ||1924||||1||
|-
|Fairey Hamble Baby||UK||Floatplane||Patrol||1917||Production||180||
|-
|Fairey III||UK||Floatplane||Patrol||1918||Production||964||
|-
|Fairey N.4||UK||Flying boat||Patrol||1923||||3||
|-
|Fairey N.9||UK||Floatplane||experimental||1918||||1||
|-
|Fairey N.10||UK||Floatplane||Patrol||1917||||||
|-
|Fairey Pintail||UK||Amphibian||Fighter/Patrol||1920||||6||
|-
|Fairey S.9/30||UK||Floatplane||Bomber||1934||||||
|-
|Fairey Seafox||UK||Floatplane||Patrol||1936||Production||66||
|-
|Fairey Seal||UK||Floatplane||Patrol||1930||||||
|-
|Fairey Swordfish||UK||Floatplane||Bomber||1934||||||
|-
|Farman F.50||France||Flying boat||||1920s||||||
|-
|Farman F.51||France||Flying boat||Patrol||1922||||||
|-
|Farman F.60 Torp||France||Floatplane||Bomber||1920s||||||
|-
|Farman F.166, 167 & 168||France||Floatplane||Bomber||1928||||||
|-
|Farman F.271||France||Floatplane||Bomber||1934||||||
|-
|Farman HF.22||France||Floatplane||Trainer||1913||Production|| ||
|-
|Farman HF.23||France||Floatplane||Trainer||1913||Production||16||
|-
|Farman NC.470 & 471||France||Floatplane||Patrol||1938||||||
|-
|Felixstowe F.1||UK||Flying boat||Patrol||1916||||||
|-
|Felixstowe F.2||UK||Flying boat||Patrol||1917||||||
|-
|Felixstowe F.3||UK||Flying boat||Patrol||1917||||||
|-
|Felixstowe F.4 Fury||UK||Flying boat||Patrol||1918||||||
|-
|Felixstowe F.5||UK||Flying boat||Patrol||1918||||||
|-
|Felixstowe Porte Baby||UK||Flying boat||Patrol||1916||||||
|-
|Fiat C.29||Italy||Floatplane||Racer||1929||||||
|-
|Fiat CR.20 Idro||Italy||Floatplane||Fighter||1926||||||
|-
|Fiat RS.14||Italy||Floatplane||Patrol||1939||||||
|-
|Fizir AF-2||Yugoslavia||Flying boat||Private||1930||||||
|-
|Fizir F1M||Yugoslavia||Floatplane||Patrol||1930||||||
|-
|Fizir FN-H||Yugoslavia||Floatplane||Trainer||1931||||||
|-
|Fleet 50 Freighter||Canada||Floatplane||Transport||1938||||||
|-
|Fleet 80 Canuck||Canada||Floatplane||Transport||1945||||||
|-
|Fleetwings Seabird||US||Amphibian||||1937||||||
|-
|Flygfabriken LN-3 Seagull||Sweden||Amphibian||Private||2008||||||
|-
|FlyNano Nano||Finland||Flying boat||Private||2012||Prototype||1||
|-
|Focke-Wulf FW 58W||Germany||Floatplane||Trainer||1935||||||
|-
|Focke-Wulf Fw 62||Germany||Floatplane||Patrol||1937||||||
|-
|Fokker B.I & B.III||Netherlands||Flying boat||Patrol||1922||||||
|-
|Fokker B.II||Netherlands||Flying boat||Patrol||1923||||||
|-
|Fokker B.IV||Netherlands||Flying boat||Transport||1928||||6||
|-
|Fokker C.VII-W||Netherlands||Floatplane||Patrol||1928||||||
|-
|Fokker C.VIII-W||Netherlands||Floatplane||Patrol||1928||||||
|-
|Fokker C.XI-W||Netherlands||Floatplane||Patrol||1935||||||
|-
|Fokker C.XIV-W||Netherlands||Floatplane||Patrol||1937||||||
|-
|Fokker F.VII||Netherlands||Floatplane||Transport||1924||||||
|-
|Fokker Super Universal||US||Floatplane||Transport||1928||||||
|-
|Fokker T.II||Netherlands||Floatplane||Bomber||1921||||||
|-
|Fokker T.III||Netherlands||Floatplane||||1920s|||| ||
|-
|Fokker T.IV||Netherlands||Floatplane||Bomber||1927||||||
|-
|Fokker T.VIII-W||Netherlands||Floatplane||Bomber||1939||||||
|-
|Fokker Universal||US||Floatplane||Transport||1926||||||
|-
|Fokker W.3||Netherlands||Floatplane||Patrol||1915||||||
|-
|Ford Trimotor||US||Floatplane||Transport||1926||||||
|-
|Found Centennial||Canada||Floatplane||Transport||1967||||||
|-
|Found FBA-1||Canada||Floatplane||Transport||1949||||||
|-
|Found FBA-2||Canada||Floatplane||Transport||1960||||||
|-
|Friedrichshafen FF.29||Germany||Floatplane||Patrol||1914||Production||44||
|-
|Friedrichshafen FF.31||Germany||Floatplane||Patrol||1915||||2||
|-
|Friedrichshafen FF.33||Germany||Floatplane||Patrol||1914||||||
|-
|Friedrichshafen FF.34||Germany||Floatplane||||1916||||||
|-
|Friedrichshafen FF.35||Germany||Floatplane||Bomber||1916||||||
|-
|Friedrichshafen FF.37||Germany||Floatplane||||1910s|||| ||
|-
|Friedrichshafen FF.39||Germany||Floatplane||Patrol||1910s||||||
|-
|Friedrichshafen FF.40||Germany||Floatplane||||1916||||1||
|-
|Friedrichshafen FF.41||Germany||Floatplane||Bomber||1916||||||
|-
|Friedrichshafen FF.43||Germany||Floatplane||Fighter||1916||||1||
|-
|Friedrichshafen FF.44||Germany||Floatplane||Patrol||1917||||1||
|-
|Friedrichshafen FF.48||Germany||Floatplane||||1917||||3||
|-
|Friedrichshafen FF.49||Germany||Floatplane||Patrol||1917||Production||240||
|-
|Friedrichshafen FF.53||Germany||Floatplane||Bomber||1918||||3||
|-
|Friedrichshafen FF.59||Germany||Floatplane||Patrol||1914||Production||315||
|-
|GAF Nomad||Australia||Floatplane||Transport||1971||||||
|-
|Gallaudet D-4||US||Floatplane||Patrol||1918||||||
|-
|General Aeroplane Verville||US||Flying boat||||1916||||||
|-
|General Aeroplane Gamma S||US||Floatplane||||1916||||||
|-
|General Aviation PJ||US||Flying boat||Patrol||1931||||||
|-
|Gidroplan Che-22 Korvet||Russia||Flying boat||Homebuilt||1993||||||
|-
|Gloster Goring||UK||Floatplane||Bomber||1927||Prototype||1||
|-
|Gloster II||UK||Floatplane||Racer||1924||||||
|-
|Gloster III||UK||Floatplane||Racer||1925||||||
|-
|Gloster IV||UK||Floatplane||Racer||1927||||||
|-
|Gloster VI||UK||Floatplane||Racer||1929||||||
|-
|Goodyear Drake||US||Amphibian||Transport||1950||Prototype||2||
|-
|Goodyear GA-2 Duck||US||Amphibian||Transport||1944||Production||19||
|-
|Gotha WD.1||Germany||Floatplane||Patrol||1910s||||||Licensed Avro 501
|-
|Gotha WD.2||Germany||Floatplane||Patrol||1910s||||||
|-
|Gotha WD.3||Germany||Floatplane||Fighter||1910s||||||
|-
|Gotha WD.5||Germany||Floatplane||Patrol||1910s||||||
|-
|Gotha WD.7||Germany||Floatplane||||1910s|||| ||
|-
|Gotha WD.9||Germany||Floatplane||Patrol||1910s||||||
|-
|Gotha WD.11||Germany||Floatplane||||1910s|||| ||
|-
|Gotha WD.12||Germany||Floatplane||||1910s|||| ||
|-
|Gotha WD.13||Germany||Floatplane||Patrol||1917||||||
|-
|Gotha WD.14||Germany||Floatplane||Bomber||1910s||||||
|-
|Gotha WD.15||Germany||Floatplane||Patrol||1917||||||
|-
|Gotha WD.20||Germany||Floatplane||Patrol||1910s||||||
|-
|Gotha WD.22||Germany||Floatplane||Patrol||1910s||||||
|-
|Gotha WD.27||Germany||Floatplane||Patrol||1910s||||||
|-
|Gourdou-Leseurre LGL.32||France||Floatplane||Fighter||1930s||||||
|-
|Gourdou 120 HY||France||Floatplane||Patrol||1930s||||||
|-
|Gourdou-Leseurre GL.710||France||Flying boat||Transport||1934||||||
|-
|Gourdou-Leseurre GL-832 HY||France||Floatplane||Patrol||1930s||||||
|-
|Gourdou-Leseurre L.2 & GL.810||France||Floatplane||Patrol||1926||||||GL-813 HY. 
|-
|Gourdou-Leseurre M.2||France||Flying boat||Patrol||1926||||||
|-
|Great Lakes XSG||US||Amphibian||Patrol||1931||||||
|-
|Grigorovich GASN||Russia||Floatplane||Bomber||1917||||||
|-
|Grigorovich M-1||Russia||Flying boat||Private||1913||Prototype||1|| 
|-
|Grigorovich M-2||Russia||Flying boat||||1914||||||
|-
|Grigorovich M-3||Russia||Flying boat||||1914||||||
|-
|Grigorovich M-4||Russia||Flying boat||Patrol||1914|||||| 
|-
|Grigorovich M-5, M-6 M-7 & M-8||Russia||Flying boat||Patrol||1915||||||
|-
|Grigorovich M-9||Russia||Flying boat||Patrol||1915|||||| 
|-
|Grigorovich M-10||Russia||Flying boat||Patrol||1916||||||
|-
|Grigorovich M-11||Russia||Flying boat||Fighter||1916||||||
|-
|Grigorovich M-12||Russia||Flying boat||Fighter||1910s||||||
|-
|Grigorovich M-15||Russia||Flying boat||Patrol||1916||||||
|-
|Grigorovich M-16||Russia||Floatplane||Patrol||1916||||||
|-
|Grigorovich M-19||Russia||Flying boat||Patrol||1918||||||
|-
|Grigorovich M-20||Russia||Flying boat||Patrol||1916||||||
|-
|Grigorovich M-23 & M-23bis||USSR||Flying boat||Patrol||1923||||||
|-
|Grigorovich M-24 & M-24bis||USSR||Flying boat||Patrol||1922||||||
|-
|Grigorovich MK-1||Russia||Flying boat||Patrol||1916||||||
|-
|Grumman Albatross||US||Amphibian||Transport||1947||Production||466||
|-
|Grumman JF & J2F Duck||US||Amphibian||Patrol||1933||Production||632||
|-
|Grumman Goose||US||Amphibian||Transport||1937||||345||
|-
|Grumman Mallard||US||Amphibian||Transport||1946||Production||59||
|-
|Grumman Tadpole||US||Amphibian||Transport||1944||Prototype||1||
|-
|Grumman Widgeon||US||Amphibian||Transport||1940||Production||317 ||Also built as SCAN 30
|-
|Hall Air Yacht||US||Flying boat||Private||1923||Prototype||1||
|-
|Hall PH||US|| Flying boat||Patrol||1931||Production||24||
|-
|Hall XP2H||US||Flying boat||Patrol||1932||Prototype||1||
|-
|Hall XPTBH||US||Floatplane||Bomber||1937||Prototype||1||
|-
|Hamble River H.L.1 Seaplane||UK||Floatplane||||1914||Prototype|| ||
|-
|Hamilton H-47||US||Floatplane||Transport||1928||Production||||
|-
|Handley Page HP.14 or R/200||UK||Floatplane||Patrol||1917||Prototype||3||
|-
|Hanriot HD.2||France||Floatplane||Fighter||1918||||||
|-
|Hansa-Brandenburg CC||Germany||Flying boat||Fighter||1916||||||
|-
|Hansa-Brandenburg GDW||Germany||Floatplane||Bomber||1916||||||
|-
|Hansa-Brandenburg GNW||Germany||Floatplane||Patrol||1914||||||
|-
|Hansa-Brandenburg GW||Germany||Floatplane||Bomber||1916||||||
|-
|Hansa-Brandenburg KDW||Germany||Floatplane||Fighter||1916||Production||58|| 
|-
|Hansa-Brandenburg NW||Germany||Floatplane||Patrol||1914||Production||77||
|-
|Hansa-Brandenburg W||Germany||Floatplane||Patrol||1914||||||
|-
|Hansa-Brandenburg W.11||Germany||Floatplane||Fighter||1917||Prototype||3||
|-
|Hansa-Brandenburg W.12||Germany||Floatplane||Fighter||1917||Production|||181||
|-
|Hansa-Brandenburg W.13||Germany||Flying boat||Bomber||1917||Production||130||
|-
|Hansa-Brandenburg W.19||Germany||Floatplane||Fighter||1918||Production||55||
|-
|Hansa-Brandenburg W.20||Germany||Flying boat||Patrol||1910s||Prototype||||
|-
|Hansa-Brandenburg W.25||Germany||Floatplane||Fighter||1917||Prototype||1||
|-
|Hansa-Brandenburg W.27||Germany||Floatplane||Fighter||1918||Prototype||1||
|-
|Hansa-Brandenburg W.29||Germany||Floatplane||Fighter||1918||Production||78|| 
|-
|Hansa-Brandenburg W.32||Germany||Floatplane||Fighter||1918||Prototype||1||
|-
|Hansa-Brandenburg W.33||Germany||Floatplane||Fighter||1918||Production|||| 
|-
|Harbin SH-5||China||Amphibian||Patrol||1976||||||
|-
|Hawker Dantorp||UK||Floatplane||Bomber||1925||||||
|-
|Hawker Hind||UK||Floatplane||Trainer||1934||||||2 for Portugal
|-
|Hawker Osprey||UK||Floatplane||Fighter-Patrol||1930||||||
|-
|Heinkel HD 9||Germany||Floatplane||||1928||||||
|-
|Heinkel HD 14||Germany||Floatplane||Bomber||1925||||||
|-
|Heinkel HD 16||Germany||Floatplane||Bomber||1928||||||
|-
|Heinkel HD 18||Germany||Floatplane||Transport||1925||||||
|-
|Heinkel HE 1||Germany||Floatplane||Patrol||1921||||||
|-
|Heinkel HE 2||Germany||Floatplane||Patrol||1923||||||
|-
|Heinkel HE 3||Germany||Floatplane||Private||1923||||||
|-
|Heinkel HE 4||Germany||Floatplane||||1926||||||
|-
|Heinkel HE 5||Germany||Floatplane||Patrol||1926||||||
|-
|Heinkel HE 8||Germany||Floatplane||Patrol||1927||||||
|-
|Heinkel HE 12||Germany||Floatplane||Transport||1929||||||
|-
|Heinkel HE 24||Germany||Floatplane||Trainer||1926||||||
|-
|Heinkel HE 25||Germany||Floatplane||Fighter||1925||||||
|-
|Heinkel HE 26||Germany||Floatplane||Fighter||1925||||||
|-
|Heinkel HE 31||Germany||Floatplane||Patrol||1927||||||
|-
|Heinkel HE 42||Germany||Floatplane||||1931||||||
|-
|Heinkel He 50||Germany||Floatplane||Bomber||1931||||||
|-
|Heinkel He 51||Germany||Floatplane||Fighter||1933||||||
|-
|Heinkel He 55||Germany||Flying boat||Patrol||1929||||||
|-
|Heinkel He 56||Germany||Floatplane||Patrol||1929||||||
|-
|Heinkel He 57||Germany||Amphibian||Transport||1929||||||
|-
|Heinkel He 58||Germany||Floatplane||Transport||1932||||||
|-
|Heinkel He 59||Germany||Floatplane||Patrol||1931||||||
|-
|Heinkel He 60||Germany||Floatplane||Patrol||1933||||||
|-
|Heinkel He 62||Germany||Floatplane||Patrol||1932||||||
|-
|Heinkel He 114||Germany||Floatplane||Patrol||1936||||||
|-
|Heinkel He 115||Germany||Floatplane||Patrol||1936||||||
|-
|Heinkel He 119||Germany||Floatplane||Patrol||1936||||||
|-
|Helio Courier||US||Floatplane||Transport||1949||||||
|-
|Hiro H1H||Japan||Flying boat||Patrol||1920s||||||
|-
|Hiro H2H||Japan||Flying boat||Patrol||1930||||||
|-
|Hiro H4H||Japan||Flying boat||Patrol||1931||||||
|-
|Hopfner HA-11/33||Austria||Amphibian||||1933||||||
|-
|Howard DGA-15||US||Floatplane||Transport||1939||||||
|-
|Huff-Daland HN||US||Floatplane||Trainer||1920s||||||
|-
|Hughes H-4 Hercules||US||Flying boat||Transport||1947||Prototype||1||
|-
|IAR-818H||Romania||Floatplane||Transport||1964||||||
|-
|ICON A5||US||Amphibian||||2008||Private|||| 
|-
|Ikarus IM||Yugoslavia||Flying boat||Transport||1920s||||||
|-
|Ikarus IO||Yugoslavia||Flying boat||Transport||1927||||||
|-
|Ikarus Kurir H||Yugoslavia||Floatplane||Patrol||1957||||||
|-
|Ikarus ŠM||Yugoslavia||Flying boat||||1924||Production||42||
|-
|IMAM Ro.43||Italy||Floatplane||Patrol||1935||Production||193||
|-
|IMAM Ro.44||Italy||Floatplane||Fighter||1936||Production||35||
|-
|Independent Aircraft Sea Dragon||US||Amphibian||Private|| ||Homebuilt|| ||
|-
|Ireland Neptune||US||Amphibian||Private||1927||Production||56||gear removable
|-
|Ireland Privateer||US||Amphibian||Private||1930||Production||18||gear removable
|-
|Island X-199 Spectra||US||Flying boat||Private||1969||Prototype||||
|-
|IVL A.22 Hansa||Finland||Floatplane||Patrol||1922||||120||
|-
|Junkers A 20 / Ju 20||Germany||Floatplane||Patrol||1923||||||
|-
|Junkers F.13||Germany||Floatplane||Transport||1919||||||
|-
|Junkers G 24||Germany||Floatplane||Transport||1924||||||
|-
|Junkers Ju 46||Germany||Floatplane||Transport||1932||||||
|-
|Junkers Ju 52||Germany||Floatplane||Transport/Bomber||1930||||||
|-
|Junkers W 33||Germany||Floatplane||Transport||1926||||||
|-
|Junkers W 34||Germany||Floatplane||Transport||1926||||||
|-
|Kawanishi E5K||Japan||Floatplane||Patrol||1931||Prototype||20||
|-
|Kawanishi E7K||Japan||Floatplane||Patrol||1933||||||
|-
|Kawanishi E15K Shiun||Japan||Floatplane||Patrol||1941||||15||
|-
|Kawanishi H3K||Japan||Flying boat||Patrol||1931||||||
|-
|Kawanishi H6K||Japan||Flying boat||Patrol/transport||1936||||||
|-
|Kawanishi H8K||Japan||Flying boat||Patrol/transport||1940||||||
|-
|Kawanishi K-7||Japan||Floatplane||Transport||1924||||||
|-
|Kawanishi K8K||Japan||Floatplane||Trainer||1938||||||
|-
|Kawanishi N1K1 Kyofu||Japan||Floatplane||Fighter||1942||||||
|-
|Keystone Air Yacht||US||Amphibian||Transport||1930||||||
|-
|Keystone PK||US||Flying boat||Patrol||1930||||||
|-
|Kirkham-Williams X||US||Floatplane||Racer||1927||||1||
|-
|Klemm Kl 35bW||Germany||Floatplane||Trainer||||||||
|-
|LFG Stralsund V 19 Putbus||Germany||Floatplane||||1918||||||
|-
|LFG W1 or W||Germany||Floatplane||||1916||||||Navalized Albatros C.Ia 
|-
|LFG WD or W||Germany||Floatplane||||1917||||||
|-
|Lake LA-4 Amphibian, Buccaneer and EP||US||Amphibian||||||||||.
|-
|Lakes Hydro-monoplane||UK||Floatplane||||1913||||||
|-
|Lakes Seabird||UK||Floatplane||||1912||||||
|-
|Lakes Waterbird||UK||Floatplane||||1911||||||
|-
|Lakes Waterhen||UK||Floatplane||||1912||||||
|-
|Latécoère 15||France||Floatplane||||1924||||||
|-
|Latécoère 21||France||Flying boat||||1926||||||
|-
|Latécoère 21||France||Flying boat||||1927||||||
|-
|Latécoère 32||France||Flying boat||Transport||1928||||||
|-
|Latécoère 34||France||Flying boat||Transport||1930||||||
|-
|Latécoère 44||France||Floatplane||Bomber||1931||||||
|-
|Latécoère 50||France||Flying boat||||1931||||||
|-
|Latécoère 225||France||Single seat amphibian ultralight||||1984||||1||In museum in Biscarrosse
|-
|Latécoère 290, 293, 294 & 296||France||Floatplane||Bomber||1931||||||
|-
|Latécoère 298||France||Floatplane||Patrol||1936||||||
|-
|Latécoère 300, 301 & 302||France||Flying boat||||1931||||||
|-
|Latécoère 380 & 381||France||Flying boat||||1930||||||
|-
|Latécoère 501||France||Flying boat||||1932||||||
|-
|Latécoère 521||France||Flying boat||Transport||1935||||||
|-
|Latécoère 522||France||Flying boat||Transport||1935|||||
|-
|Latécoère 523||France||Flying boat||Transport||1935||||||
|-
|Latécoère 550||France||Floatplane||Bomber||1934||||||
|-
|Latécoère 582||France||Flying boat||Patrol||1935||||||
|-
|Latécoère 611||France||Flying boat||Bomber||1939||||||
|-
|Latécoère 631||France||Flying boat||Transport||1942||||||
|-
|Latham 42||France||Flying boat||Bomber||1924||||||
|-
|Latham 43||France||Flying boat||Patrol||1924||||||
|-
|Latham 45||France||Flying boat||||1920s||||||
|-
|Latham 47||France||Flying boat||Patrol||1928||||||
|-
|Latham 230||France||Floatplane||Patrol||1928||||1||
|-
|Latham C.1||France||Flying boat||Bomber||1923||||||
|-
|Latham HB.5||France||Flying boat||Patrol||1921||||||
|-
|Latham L.1||France||Flying boat||Racer||1923||||||
|-
|Latham L.2||France||Flying boat||Racer||1923||||||
|-
|Letov Š-328.v||Czechoslovakia||Floatplane||Patrol||1936||||4||
|-
|Levasseur PL.14||France||Floatplane||Bomber||1929||||||
|-
|Levasseur PL.15||France||Floatplane||Bomber||1929||||||
|-
|Levasseur PL.200||France||Floatplane||Patrol||1935||||||
|-
|Levy G.L.40||France||Flying boat||Patrol||1917||||||
|-
|Lioré et Olivier LeO H-242||France||Flying boat||Transport||||||||
|-
|Lioré et Olivier LeO H-10||France||Floatplane||Patrol||1923||||||
|-
|Lioré et Olivier LeO H-13||France||Flying boat||||1922||||||
|-
|Lioré et Olivier LeO H-18||France||Flying boat||||1928||||||
|-
|Lioré et Olivier LeO H-22||France||Flying boat||Transport||1931||||||
|-
|Lioré et Olivier LeO H-23||France||Amphibian||Patrol||1930||||||
|-
|Lioré et Olivier LeO H-24||France||Flying boat||Transport||1929||||||
|-
|Lioré et Olivier LeO 25||France||Floatplane||Bomber||1928||||||
|-
|Lioré et Olivier LeO H-27||France||Flying boat||Transport||1930||||||
|-
|Lioré et Olivier LeO H-43||France||Floatplane||Patrol||1934||||||
|-
|Lioré et Olivier LeO H-46||France||Floatplane||Patrol||1936||||||
|-
|Lioré et Olivier LeO H-47||France||Flying boat||Transport||1936||||||
|-
|Lioré et Olivier LeO H-190||France||Flying boat||||1926||||||
|-
|Lioré et Olivier LeO H-246||France||Flying boat||Transport||1937||||||
|-
|LISA Akoya||France||Flying boat||Private||2011||||||Hydrofoil
|-
|Lockwood Aircam||US||Floatplane||Private||1995||Homebuilt||||
|-
|Loening 1911||US||Flying boat||||1911||||||
|-
|Loening Amphibian||US||Amphibian||||1923||||||
|-
|Loening C-1||US||Amphibian||Transport||1928||||8||
|-
|Loening C-2 Air yacht||US||Amphibian||Transport||1928||||||
|-
|Keystone-Loening Air Yacht||US||Amphibian||Transport||1928||||2||
|-
|Loening C-5||US||Amphibian||Transport||1934||Prototype||1||
|-
|Keystone–Loening Commuter||US||Amphibian||Transport||1929||Production||31||
|-
|Loening Duckling||US||Flying boat||Experimental||1918||||1||
|-
|Loening M-2 Kitten||US||Floatplane||Patrol||1918||Prototypes||3||
|-
|Loening M-3||US||Floatplane||Patrol||||||1||
|-
|Loening M-81-S and LS||US||Floatplane||Fighter||1918||||||
|-
|Loening Model 23 Air yacht||US||Flying boat||Transport||1922|||| ||
|-
|Loening Monoduck||US||Flying boat||Transport||1934||Prototype||1||
|-
|Loening OL & variants||US||Amphibian||Patrol||1923||||||
|-
|Loening S-1 Air Yacht||US||Flying boat||Transport||1922|||| ||
|-
|Loening SL||US||Flying boat||Patrol||1931||Prototype||1||
|-
|Loening XS2L||US||Flying boat||Patrol||1933||Prototype||1||
|-
|Lohner E||||Flying boat||Patrol||1914||||||
|-
|Lohner L & S||Austria-Hungary||Flying boat||Patrol||1915||||||
|-
|Lohner R||Austria-Hungary||Flying boat||Patrol||1910s||||||
|-
|Loire 50||France||Flying boat||Transport||1931||||||
|-
|Loire 60||France||Flying boat||Transport||1932||||||
|-
|Loire 70||France||Flying boat||Patrol||1933||||||
|-
|Loire 102 Bretagne||France||Flying boat||Transport||1936||||||
|-
|Loire 130||France||Flying boat||Transport||1934||||||
|-
|Loire 210||France||Floatplane||Fighter||1935||||||
|-
|Loire-Nieuport LN.10||France||Floatplane||||1939||||||
|-
|Lübeck-Travemünde F.1||Germany||Floatplane||||1914||||||
|-
|Lübeck-Travemünde F.2||Germany||Floatplane||||1917||||||
|-
|Lübeck-Travemünde F.4||Germany||Floatplane||||1917||||||
|-
|Lublin R-VIII||Poland||Floatplane||Patrol||1930s||||3||
|-
|Lublin R-XIII||Poland||Floatplane||Patrol||1930s||||20||
|-
|Macchi L.1||Italy||Flying boat||Patrol||1915||||||
|-
|Macchi L.2||Italy||Flying boat||Patrol||1916||||10||
|-
|Macchi L.3/M.3||Italy||Flying boat||Patrol||1916||||200||
|-
|Macchi M.4||Italy||Flying boat||Patrol||1917||Prototype||2||
|-
|Macchi M.5||Italy||Flying boat||Fighter||1917||Production||244||
|-
|Macchi M.6||Italy||Flying boat||Fighter||1917||Prototype||1||
|-
|Macchi M.7||Italy||Flying boat||Fighter||1918||Production||100+||
|-
|Macchi M.8||Italy||Flying boat||Patrol||1917||Production||57||
|-
|Macchi M.9||Italy||Flying boat||Patrol||1918||Production||30 ca.||
|-
|Macchi M.12||Italy||Flying boat||Bomber||1918||Production||10 ca.||
|-
|Macchi M.17||Italy||Flying boat||Racer||1919||||||
|-
|Macchi M.18||Italy||Flying boat||Patrol||1928||||||
|-
|Macchi M.19||Italy||Flying boat||Racer||1920||||||
|-
|Macchi M.24||Italy||Flying boat||Patrol||1923||||||
|-
|Macchi M.26||Italy||Flying boat||Fighter||1924||||||
|-
|Macchi M.33||Italy||Flying boat||Racer||1925||||||
|-
|Macchi M.39||Italy||Floatplane||Racer||1926||||||
|-
|Macchi M.40||Italy||Floatplane||Patrol||1928||||||
|-
|Macchi M.41||Italy||Flying boat||Fighter||1927||||||
|-
|Macchi M.52||Italy||Floatplane||Racer||1927||||||
|-
|Macchi M.53||Italy||Floatplane||Patrol||1928||||||
|-
|Macchi M.67||Italy||Floatplane||Racer||1928||||||
|-
|Macchi M.70||Italy||Floatplane||Private||1929||||||
|-
|Macchi M.71||Italy||Flying boat||Fighter||1930||||||
|-
|Macchi M.C.72||Italy||Floatplane||Racer||1931||||||
|-
|Macchi M.C.73 Idro||Italy||Floatplane||Trainer||1931||||||
|-
|Macchi M.C.77||Italy||Flying boat||Patrol||1935||||||
|-
|Macchi M.C.94||Italy||Flying boat||Transport||1935||||||
|-
|Macchi M.C.99||Italy||Flying boat||Patrol||1937||||||
|-
|Macchi M.C.100||Italy||Flying boat||Transport||1939||||||
|-
|Mann Egerton Type B||UK||Floatplane||Patrol||1915||Production||15||
|-
|Marinens Flyvebaatfabrikk M.F.1||Norway||Floatplane||Patrol||1915||Production||5||
|-
|Marinens Flyvebaatfabrikk M.F.2||Norway||Floatplane||Patrol||1916||Production||3||
|-
|Marinens Flyvebaatfabrikk M.F.3||Norway||Floatplane||Patrol||1917||Production||4||
|-
|Marinens Flyvebaatfabrikk M.F.4||Norway||Floatplane||Trainer||1918||Production||6|| 
|-
|Marinens Flyvebaatfabrikk M.F.5||Norway||Floatplane||Patrol||1919||Production||9||
|-
|Marinens Flyvebaatfabrikk M.F.6||Norway||Floatplane||Trainer||1921||||2||
|-
|Marinens Flyvebaatfabrikk M.F.7||Norway||Floatplane||Trainer||1923||||2||
|-
|Marinens Flyvebaatfabrikk M.F.8||Norway||Floatplane||Trainer||1924||Production||8||
|-
|Marinens Flyvebaatfabrikk M.F.9||Norway||Floatplane||Fighter||1925||Production||10||
|-
|Marinens Flyvebaatfabrikk M.F.10||Norway||Floatplane||Trainer||1929||Production||4||
|-
|Marinens Flyvebaatfabrikk M.F.11||Norway||Floatplane||Patrol||1932||Production||29||
|-
|Marinens Flyvebaatfabrikk M.F.12||Norway||Floatplane||Trainer||1939||Prototype||1||
|-
|Martin 130||US||Flying boat||Transport||1935||Production||3||
|-
|Martin 156||US||Flying boat||Transport||1937||Prototype||1||
|-
|Martin Mars||US||Flying boat||Transport||1942||Production||7||also used as waterbomber
|-
|Martin MO||US||Floatplane||Patrol||1924||Production||36||
|-
|Martin P2M||US||Flying boat||Transport||1929||||78||
|-
|Martin P3M||US||Flying boat||Patrol||1920s||||||
|-
|Martin P5M Marlin||US||Flying boat||Patrol||1948||||||
|-
|Martin P6M SeaMaster||US||Flying boat||Transport/Patrol||1955||||||
|-
|Martin PBM Mariner||US||Flying boat||Patrol||1939||||||
|-
|Martinsyde F6||UK||Floatplane||Transport||1918||||||
|-
|Maule M-1||US||Floatplane||||1932||||||
|-
|Microleve Corsario||Brazil||Amphibian||Private||1988||||||
|-
|Militi M.B.1||Italy||Flying boat||Private||1967||Homebuilt||||Glider
|-
|Militi M.B.2 Leonardo||Italy||Flying boat||||1970||Homebuilt||||
|-
|Mitsubishi F1M||Japan||Floatplane||Patrol||1936||||||
|-
|Morane-Saulnier G||France||Floatplane||Racer||1912|||||| 
|-
|Murphy Moose||Canada||Floatplane||Transport||1990||||||
|-
|Murphy Rebel||Canada||Floatplane||Transport||1990||||||
|-
|Nakajima A6M2-N||Japan||Floatplane||Fighter||1942||||||
|-
|Nakajima E2N||Japan||Floatplane||Patrol||1929||||||
|-
|Nakajima E4N||Japan||Floatplane||Patrol||1930||||||
|-
|Nakajima E8N||Japan||Floatplane||Patrol||1934||||||
|-
|Nardi F.N.333 Riviera||Italy||Amphibian||Transport||1952||||||
|-
|Naval Air Establishment Chiang Hung||China||Floatplane||Transport||1931||||||
|-
|Naval Aircraft Factory N3N Canary||US||Floatplane||Trainer||1935||||||
|-
|Naval Aircraft Factory PN||US||Flying boat||Patrol||1918||||||
|-
|Naval Aircraft Factory PT||US||Floatplane||Bomber||1922||||||
|-
|Naval Aircraft Factory TF||US||Flying boat||Fighter||1920||||||
|-
|Naval Aircraft Factory TG||US||Floatplane||Trainer||1922||||||
|-
|Naval Aircraft Factory TR-2||US|| Floatplane||Trainer||1923||||||
|-
|Naval Aircraft Factory TS||US||Floatplane||Fighter||1922||||46||
|-
|Navy-Wright NW-2||US||Floatplane||Racer||1923||||1||
|-
|Nieuport IV.H||France||Floatplane||Racer||1912||||||
|-
|Nieuport VI.H||France||Floatplane||Racer/Patrol||1913||||||
|-
|Nieuport X.H||France||Floatplane||Patrol||1913||||||
|-
|Nieuport-Delage Ni-D 29 H||France||Floatplane||Racer||1919||||||
|-
|Nieuport-Delage NiD 43||France||Floatplane||Fighter||1924||Prototype||1||
|-
|Nieuport-Delage NiD 450, 650, 651 and 652||France||Floatplane||Racer|||1930||||||
|-
|Noorduyn Norseman||Canada||Floatplane||Transport||1935||||||
|-
|Nord 1400, 1401 and 1402 Noroit||France||Flying boat||Patrol||1949||||||
|-
|Nordic Omsider||Norway||Amphibian||||2010s||||||
|-
|Norman Thompson N.1B||UK||Flying boat||Patrol||1917||Prototype||||
|-
|Norman Thompson N.2C||UK||Flying boat||||1918||||||
|-
|Norman Thompson N.T.2B||UK||Flying boat||Trainer||1917||||||
|-
|Norman Thompson N.T.4||UK||Flying boat||Patrol||1916||||72||
|-
|Norsk Flyindustri Finnmark 5A||Norway||Amphibian||Transport||1949||Prototype||1||
|-
|Northrop Delta||US||Floatplane||Patrol/Transport||1933||Production||32||
|-
|Northrop Gamma||US||Floatplane||Transport||1932||Production||60||
|-
|Northrop N-3PB||US||Floatplane||Bomber||1940||||||
|-
|Oeffag G||Austria-Hungary||Flying boat||Patrol||1916||||||
|-
|Oertz FB 3||Germany||Flying boat||Private||1913||||1||
|-
|Oertz W 4||Germany||Flying boat||Patrol||1914||||2||
|-
|Oertz W 5||Germany||Flying boat||Patrol||1916||||5||
|-
|Oertz W 6 Flugschoner||Germany||Flying boat||Patrol||||||1||
|-
|Oertz W 7||Germany||Flying boat||Patrol||||||2||
|-
|Oertz W 8||Germany||Flying boat||Patrol||||||1||
|-
|Osprey Osprey 2||US||Amphibian||Private||1973||Homebuilt||||
|-
|Osprey Osprey I||US||Amphibian||||1970||Homebuilt||||
|-
|Parnall Perch||UK||Floatplane||Trainer||1926||||1||
|-
|Parnall Peto||UK||Floatplane||Patrol||1926|| || 2||
|-
|Parnall Pike||UK||Floatplane||Patrol||1927||||1||
|-
|Parnall Pipit||UK||Floatplane||Fighter||1928||2||
|-
|Parnall Plover||UK||Amphibian||Fighter||1922||||||
|-
|Parnall Prawn||UK||Flying boat||Fighter||1930||||1||
|-
|Parnall Puffin||UK||Amphibian||Fighter-Patrol||1920||||3||
|-
|Percheron 18||France||Floatplane||Patrol||||||||
|-
|Percival Proctor 6||UK||Floatplane||Transport||1946||||||
|-
|Phoenix Cork||UK||Flying boat||Patrol||1918||||||
|-
|Piaggio P.6||Italy||Floatplane||Patrol||1927||||||
|-
|Piaggio P.7||Italy||Flying boat||Racer||1929||Prototype||1||Hydrofoil, Not flown 
|-
|Piaggio P.8||Italy||Floatplane||||1928||||||
|-
|Piaggio P.136||Italy||Amphibian||Transport||1948||||||
|-
|Piper J-3 Cub||US||Floatplane||Transport||1938||||||
|-
|Piper PA-12 Super Cruiser||US||Floatplane||Transport||1944||||||
|-
|Piper PA-18 Super Cub||US||Floatplane||Transport||1949||||||
|-
|Piper PA-20 Pacer||US||Floatplane||Transport||1949||||||
|-
|Piper PA-23 Apache||US||Floatplane||Transport||1952||||||
|-
|Polaris AM-FIB||Italy||Amphibian||Privates||1986||||||
|-
|Polikarpov MR-1||USSR||Floatplane||Patrol||1918|||| ||
|-
|Port Victoria P.V.1||UK||Floatplane||Fighter||1916||||||
|-
|Port Victoria P.V.2||UK||Floatplane||Fighter||1916||||||
|-
|Port Victoria P.V.4||UK||Floatplane||Patrol||1917||||||
|-
|Port Victoria P.V.5||UK||Floatplane||Fighter||1917||||||
|-
|Port Victoria P.V.9||UK||Floatplane||Fighter||1917||||||
|-
|Potez 450||France||Flying boat||Fighter||1932||||||
|-
|Potez-CAMS 141||France||Flying boat||Patrol||1938||||||
|-
|Potez-CAMS 161||France||Flying boat||Transport||1939||||||
|-
|Privateer Industries Privateer||US||Floatplane||Transport||2018||Prototype||1||
|-
|Progressive Aerodyne Searey||US||Amphibian||Private||1990s||Homebuilt||||
|-
|Progressive Aerodyne Stingray||US||Amphibian||Private||1990s||Homebuilt||||
|-
|Quest Kodiak||US||Floatplane||Transport ||2010||||||
|-
|RAS-1 Getta||Romania||Flying boat||Trainer||1925||||||
|-
|Republic RC-3 Seabee||US||Amphibian||||1945||||1060||
|-
|Rocheville/EMSCO Arctic Tern||US||Floatplane||Exploration||1932||Experimental||1|| 
|-
|Rogožarski PVT||Yugoslavia||Floatplane||Trainer||1934||||||
|-
|Rogožarski SIM-XII-H||Yugoslavia||Floatplane||Trainer||1936||||||
|-
|Rogožarski SIM-XIV-H||Yugoslavia||Floatplane||Patrol||1940||||||
|-
|Rohrbach Ro II||Germany||Flying boat||Transport||1923||||||
|-
|Rohrbach Ro III||Germany||Flying boat||Transport||1924||||||
|-
|Rohrbach Ro IV||Germany||Flying boat||Transport||1925||||||
|-
|Rohrbach Ro V Rocco||Germany||Flying boat||Transport||1927||||||
|-
|Rohrbach Ro VII Robbe||Germany||Flying boat||Transport/Patrol||1926||||||
|-
|Rohrbach Ro X Romar||Germany||Flying boat||Transport||1928||||||
|-
|Royal Aircraft Factory C.E.1||UK||Flying boat||Patrol||1918||||||
|-
|Rumpler 4B 11||Germany||Floatplane||Patrol||1914||||||
|-
|Rumpler 4B 12||Germany||Floatplane||Patrol||1914||||||
|-
|Saab S 17BS||Sweden||Floatplane||Reconnaissance||1940||Production||38||
|-
|Sablatnig SF-1||Germany||Floatplane||Patrol||1917||||||
|-
|Sablatnig SF-2||Germany||Floatplane||Patrol||1916||||||
|-
|Sablatnig SF-3||Germany||Floatplane||Fighter||1917||||||
|-
|Sablatnig SF-4||Germany||Floatplane||Fighter||1917||||||
|-
|Sablatnig SF-5||Germany||Floatplane||Patrol||1917||||||
|-
|Sablatnig SF-7||Germany||Floatplane||Fighter||1917||||||
|-
|Sablatnig SF-8||Germany||Floatplane||Trainer||1918||||||
|-
|Sage Type 4||UK||Floatplane||Patrol||1917||||2||
|-
|Saro A.17 Cutty Sark||UK||Amphibian||Transport||1929||||||
|-
|Saro A.19 Cloud||UK||Flying boat||Transport||1930||||||
|-
|Saro A.33||UK||Flying boat||Patrol||1938||||||
|-
|Saro Lerwick||UK||Flying boat||Patrol||1940||||||
|-
|Saro London||UK||Flying boat||Patrol||1934||||||
|-
|Saro Shrimp||UK||Flying boat||Experimental||1939||||||
|-
|Saro Windhover||UK||Flying boat||Transport||1930||||||
|-
|Saunders A.7 Severn||UK||Flying boat||||1930||||||
|-
|Saunders A.14||UK||Flying boat||Experimental||1928||||||
|-
|Saunders A.3 Valkyrie||UK||Flying boat||Patrol||1927||||||
|-
|Saunders A.4 Medina||UK||Flying boat||Transport||1925||||||
|-
|Saunders Kittiwake||UK||Amphibian||||1920||||||
|-
|Saunders-Roe Princess||UK||Flying boat||Transport||1952||||||
|-
|Saunders-Roe SR.A/1||UK||Flying boat||Fighter||1947||||||
|-
|Savoia-Marchetti S.55||Italy||Flying boat||Transport/Bomber||1924||||||
|-
|Savoia-Marchetti S.56||Italy||Amphibian||Trainer||1924||||||
|-
|Savoia-Marchetti S.57||Italy||Flying boat||Patrol||1923||||||
|-
|Savoia-Marchetti S.59||Italy||Flying boat||Patrol/bomber||1925||||||
|-
|Savoia-Marchetti S.65||Italy||Floatplane||Racer||1929||||||
|-
|Savoia-Marchetti S.66||Italy||Flying boat||Transport||1931||||||
|-
|Savoia-Marchetti SM.62||Italy||Flying boat||Patrol/bomber ||1926|||||| 
|-
|Savoia-Marchetti SM.87||Italy||Floatplane||Transport||1939|||||| 
|-
|SCAN 20||France||Flying boat||Trainer||1945|||||| 
|-
|Seawind 300C||Canada||Amphibian||Transport||1982||||||
|-
|SET 7H||Romania||Floatplane||Patrol ||1935||||||
|-
|Shavrov Sh-1 & Sh-2||USSR||Amphibian||Transport||1929||||||
|-
|Shavrov Sh-3||USSR||Amphibian||Transport||1936||||||
|-
|Shavrov Sh-5||USSR||Amphibian||Patrol||1934||||||
|-
|Shavrov Sh-7||USSR||Amphibian||||1940||||||
|-
|Shin Meiwa PS-1||Japan||Flying boat||Patrol||1967||||||
|-
|Shin Meiwa UF-XS||Japan||Flying boat||Experimental||1962||||||PS-1 hull form
|-
|Shin Meiwa US-1A||Japan||Amphibian||Search & rescue||1974||||||
|-
|ShinMaywa US-2||Japan||Amphibian||Search & rescue||2007||Production||6||
|-
|Short Admiralty Type 74||UK||Floatplane||Patrol||1914||||7||
|-
|Short Admiralty Type 135||UK||Floatplane||Patrol||1910s||||||
|-
|Short Admiralty Type 166||UK||Floatplane||Patrol||1914||||||
|-
|Short Admiralty Type 827||UK||Floatplane||Patrol||1914||||||
|-
|Short Admiralty Type 830||UK||Floatplane||Patrol||1914||||||

|-
|Short Gurnard||UK||Floatplane||Fighter/Patrol||1929||Prototype||2||
|-
|Short Kent||UK||Flying boat||Transport||1931||||||
|-
|Short Knuckleduster||UK||Flying boat||Patrol||1933||||||
|-
|Short Mayo Composite||UK||Flying boat|||||||| ||
|-
|Short N.2A||UK||Floatplane||Patrol||1917||||||
|-
|Short N.2B||UK||Floatplane||||1917||||||
|-
|Short N.3 Cromarty||UK||Flying boat||Patrol||1921||||||
|-
|Short Rangoon||UK||Flying boat||Patrol||1930||||||
|-
|Short S.1 Cockle||UK||Flying boat||Experimental||1924||||||
|-
|Short S.5 Singapore I||UK||Flying boat||Patrol ||1926||||||
|-
|Short S.6 Sturgeon||UK||Floatplane||Experimental||1927||||||
|-
|Short S.7 Mussel||UK||Floatplane||Private||1926||||2||
|-
|Short S.8 Calcutta||UK||Flying boat||Transport||1928||||||
|-
|Short S.12 Singapore II||UK||Flying boat||Patrol||1930||||||
|-
|Short S.15||UK||Flying boat||||1931||Prototype||||
|-
|Short S.19 Singapore III||UK||Flying boat||Patrol ||1934||||||
|-
|Short S.20 Mercury||UK||Floatplane||Transport||1938||||1||
|-
|Short S.21 Maia||UK||Flying boat||Transport||1938||||1||Seaplane-carrier
|-
|Short S.23, S.30 & S.33 Empire C-Class||UK||Flying boat||Transport||1936||||||
|-
|Short S.26 G-Class||UK||Flying boat||Transport||1936||||3||
|-
|Short S.80||UK||Floatplane||Patrol||1913||||1||
|-
|Short S.81||UK||Floatplane||Patrol||1913||||||
|-
|Short Sandringham||UK||Flying boat||Transport||1943||||||
|-
|Short Sarafand||UK||Flying boat||Patrol||1932||||||
|-
|Short Scion Senior||UK||Floatplane||Transport||1935||||||
|-
|Short Seaford||UK||Flying boat||Patrol||1934||||||
|-
|Short Sealand||UK||Amphibian||Transport||1947||||||
|-
|Short Shetland||UK||Flying boat||Patrol/Transport||1944||||||
|-
|Short Solent||UK||Flying boat||Transport||1946||||||
|-
|Short Sunderland||UK||Flying boat||Patrol||1937||||||
|-
|Short Type 184||UK||Floatplane||Bomber||1915||||||
|-
|Short Type 310||UK||Floatplane||Bomber||1916||||||
|-
|Short Valetta||UK||Floatplane||Patrol||1930||||||
|-
|Short-Bristow Crusader||UK||Floatplane||Racer||1927||||||
|-
|SIAI S.8||Italy||Flying boat||Patrol||1917||||||
|-
|SIAI S.9||Italy||Flying boat||Patrol||1918||||||
|-
|SIAI S.12||Italy||Flying boat||Patrol||1918||||||
|-
|SIAI S.13||Italy||Flying boat||Patrol||1919||||||
|-
|SIAI S.16||Italy||Flying boat||bomber/Transport||1919||||||
|-
|SIAI S.17||Italy||Flying boat||Racer||1920||||||
|-
|SIAI S.19||Italy||Flying boat||Racer||1920||||||
|-
|SIAI S.21||Italy||Flying boat||Racer||1921||||||
|-
|SIAI S.22||Italy||Flying boat||Racer||1921||||||
|-
|SIAI S.51||Italy||Flying boat||Racer||1922||||||
|-
|SIAI S.58||Italy||Flying boat||Fighter||1924||||||
|-
|SIAI S.67||Italy||Flying boat||Fighter||1930||||||
|-
|Sikorsky S-34||US||Amphibian||Transport||1927||||||
|-
|Sikorsky S-36||US ||Flying boat||Transport||1927||||||
|-
|Sikorsky S-38||US||Amphibian||Transport||1928||||||
|-
|Sikorsky S-39||US||Amphibian||Transport||1920s||||||
|-
|Sikorsky S-40||US ||Flying boat||Transport||1931|||||| 
|-
|Sikorsky S-41||US||Amphibian||Transport||1930||||||
|-
|Sikorsky S-42||US ||Flying boat||Transport||1934||||||
|-
|Sikorsky S-43||US ||Amphibian||Transport||1935||||||
|-
|Sikorsky VS-44 Excalibur & PBS||US||Flying boat||Transport||1937|||||| 
|-
|Singular Aircraft SA03||UK||Flying boat|| ||2012|||| ||
|-
|SNCAC NC.4-10||France||Floatplane||Bomber||1939|||| ||
|-
|SNCAO 30||France||Flying boat ||Trainer||1938||||||
|-
|SNCASE SE-400||France||Floatplane||Patrol||1939||||||
|-
|SNCASE SE-1210||France||Flying boat||Experimental ||1949||||||
|-
|Sopwith Baby||UK||Floatplane||Fighter||1915||||||
|-
|Sopwith Bat Boat||UK||Flying boat||||1913|||| ||
|-
|Sopwith Schneider ||UK||Floatplane||Racer||1919||||||
|-
|Sopwith Tabloid||UK||Floatplane||Racer||1914|||||| 
|-
|SPCA Météore 63||France||Flying boat||Transport||1925||||||
|-
|Spectrum RX 650 Beaver||Canada||Floatplane ||Privates||1991||||||
|-
|Spencer Air Car||US||Amphibian||Transport||1945||||||
|-
|Sperry Land and Sea Triplane||US||Amphibian||||1918||||||
|-
|Standard Twin Hydro||US||Floatplane||||1916||||||
|-
|Stearman XOSS||US||Floatplane||Patrol||1938||||||
|-
|Stinson L-1 Vigilant||US||Floatplane||Patrol||1940||||||
|-
|Stinson L-13||US||Floatplane||Patrol||1945||||||
|-
|Sun Lake Aircraft||US||Amphibian||Private||||||||
|-
|Supermarine Air Yacht||UK||Flying boat||Transport||1931||||||
|-
|Supermarine Baby||UK||Flying boat||Fighter||1917||||||
|-
|Supermarine Channel||UK||Flying boat||||1919||||||
|-
|Supermarine S.4||UK||Floatplane||Racer||1925||||1||
|-
|Supermarine S.5||UK||Floatplane||Racer||1927||||3||
|-
|Supermarine S.6||UK||Floatplane||Racer||1931||||2||
|-
|Supermarine S.6B||UK||Floatplane||Racer||1931||||2||
|-
|Supermarine Scapa||UK||Flying boat||Patrol||1935||||||
|-
|Supermarine Scarab||UK||Flying boat||Patrol||1924||Production||12||
|-
|Supermarine Sea Eagle||UK||Amphibian||||1923||||3||
|-
|Supermarine Sea King||UK||Flying boat||Fighter||1920||Prototype||2||
|-
|Supermarine Sea Lion I||UK||Flying boat||Racer||1919||||||
|-
|Supermarine Sea Lion II||UK||Flying boat||Racer||1922||||||
|-
|Supermarine Sea Otter||UK||Flying boat||Patrol||1938||Production||292||
|-
|Supermarine Seagull||UK||Flying boat||Patrol||1922||Production||3||
|-
|Supermarine Seagull ASR-1||UK||Amphibian||Patrol||1948||Prototype||2||
|-
|Supermarine Seal II||UK||Amphibian||Patrol||1921||||||
|-
|Supermarine Southampton||UK||Flying boat||Patrol||1925||Production||83||
|-
|Supermarine Spitfire||UK||Floatplane||Fighter||1940–42||||||
|-
|Supermarine Stranraer||UK||Flying boat||Patrol||1936||||||
|-
|Supermarine Swan||UK||Flying boat||Transport||1924||||||
|-
|Supermarine Walrus||UK||Flying boat||Patrol||1936||||||
|-
|Taylor Coot||US||Amphibian||Private||1969||Homebuilt||||
|-
|Thurston Teal||US||Amphibian||Private||1960s||||||
|-
|Trident TR-1 Trigull||Canada||Flying boat||Transport||1973||||||
|-
|Tupolev ANT-4||USSR||Floatplane||Bomber||1925||||||
|-
|Tupolev ANT-8||USSR||Flying boat||Patrol||1931||||||
|-
|Tupolev ANT-22||USSR||Flying boat||Patrol||1934||||||
|-
|Tupolev MP-6||USSR||Floatplane||Patrol||1923||Production||411||
|-
|Tupolev MTB-1||USSR||Flying boat||Patrol||1934||||||
|-
|Tupolev MTB-2||USSR||Flying boat||Bomber/Transport||1937|||||| 
|-
|Tupolev TB-1P||USSR||Floatplane||Bomber||1923||||||
|-
|Utva 66H||Yugoslavia||Floatplane||Trainer||1960s||||||
|-
|Vickers Aircraft Wave||New Zealand||Flying boat||Private||2011||Project||0||
|-
|Vickers Valentia||UK||Flying boat||Transport||1918||||||
|-
|Vickers Vanellus||UK||Amphibian||Patrol||1922||||||
|-
|Vickers Vendace
|UK
|Floatplane
|Trainer
|1926
| 
|5
|4 built as landplanes
|-
|Vickers Viking||UK||Amphibian||Transport||1919||||||
|-
|Vickers Vildebeest||UK||Floatplane||Patrol||1926||||||
|-
|Vickers Vulture||UK||Amphibian||Transport||1924||Prototype||2||
|-
|VL Sääski||Finland||Floatplane||Trainer||1928||||||
|-
|Volmer VJ-22 Sportsman||US||Amphibian||Private||1958||||||
|-
|Vought O2U Corsair||US||Floatplane||Patrol||1926||||||
|-
|Vought O3U Corsair||US||Floatplane||Patrol||1930||||||
|-
|Vought O5U||US||Floatplane||Patrol||1934||||||
|-
|Vought OS2U Kingfisher||US||Floatplane||Patrol||1938||||||
|-
|Vought UO||US||Floatplane||Patrol||1922||||||
|-
|Vought VE-9H||US||Floatplane ||Patrol||1922||||||
|-
|Vought VE-10 Batboat||US||Flying boat||Trainer||1919||||||
|-
|Vought XSB2U-3 Vindicator||US||Floatplane||Bomber||1936||||||
|-
|Vought XSO2U||US||Floatplane||Patrol||1939||||||
|-
|Vultee V-1AS||US||Floatplane||Transport||1933||||1||For USSR
|-
|Vultee V-11GB2F||US||Floatplane||Bomber||1935||||1||For Brazil
|-
|Wackett Widgeon||Australia||Amphibian||||1925||||||
|-
|Waco Standard Cabin series||US||Floatplane||Transport||1931||||||
|-
|Waco ZQC-6||US||Floatplane ||Transport||1936||||||
|-
|Walsh Brothers Flying Boats||New Zealand||Flying boat||Trainer||1915||||||
|-
|Watanabe E9W||Japan||Floatplane||Patrol||1934||||||
|-
|Watanabe K6W||Japan||Floatplane||Trainer||1937||||||
|-
|Watanabe K8W||Japan||Floatplane||Trainer||1938||||||
|-
|Watanabe WS-103S||Japan||Floatplane||Patrol||1938||||||
|-
|Westland Wapiti||UK||Floatplane||Patrol||1927||||||
|-
|White and Thompson No. 3||UK||Flying boat||||1914||||||
|-
|Wight Baby||UK||Floatplane||Fighter||1916||||||
|-
|Wight Converted Seaplane||UK||Floatplane||Bomber||1916||||||
|-
|Wight Pusher Seaplane||UK||Floatplane||||1914||||||
|-
|Wight Seaplane||UK||Floatplane||||1915||||||
|-
|Wilson Global Explorer||US||Amphibian||Transport||1991||||||
|-
|Yokosuka E1Y||Japan||Floatplane||Patrol||1923||||||
|-
|Yokosuka E6Y||Japan||Floatplane||Patrol||1929||||||
|-
|Yokosuka E14Y||Japan||Floatplane||Patrol||1939||||||
|-
|Yokosuka H5Y||Japan||Flying boat||Patrol||1936||||||
|-
|Yokosuka Igo-Ko||Japan||Floatplane||Trainer||1920||||||
|-
|Yokosuka K1Y||Japan||Floatplane||Trainer||1924||||||
|-
|Yokosuka K4Y||Japan||Floatplane||Trainer||1930||||||
|-
|Yokosuka K5Y1||Japan||Floatplane ||Trainer||1930s||||||
|-
|Yokosuka Ro-go Ko-gata||Japan||Floatplane||Patrol||1910s||||||
|-
|Zenith STOL CH 701||Canada||Floatplane||||1986||Homebuilt||||
|-
|Zeppelin-Lindau Rs.I||Germany||Flying boat||Patrol||||Prototype||1||Not flown
|-
|Zeppelin-Lindau Rs.II||Germany||Flying boat||Patrol||1916||Prototype||1||
|-
|Zeppelin-Lindau Rs.III||Germany||Flying boat||Patrol||1917||Prototype||1||
|-
|Zeppelin-Lindau Rs.IV||Germany||Flying boat||Patrol ||1918||Prototype||1||
|}

See also

 List of seaplane operators

References

Notes

Citations

Bibliography
 
 
 
 

Lists of aircraft by design configuration
Floatplanes
Flying boats
Amphibious aircraft
Seaplanes